Friends is the thirteenth album by Chick Corea. It features a quartet of Corea, saxophonist Joe Farrell, acoustic bassist Eddie Gómez and drummer Steve Gadd. It was released by Polydor Records in 1978, and the cover featured The Smurfs.

Friends received the 1979 Grammy award for Best Jazz Instrumental Performance, Group.

Track listing 
All pieces are composed by Chick Corea.

Side one
"The One Step" – 6:05
"Waltse for Dave" – 7:32
"Children's Song #5" – 1:15
"Samba Song" – 10:00

Side two
"Friends" – 9:26
"Sicily" – 6:15
"Children's Song #15" – 1:10
"Cappucino" – 8:39

Personnel 
 Chick Corea – Steinway acoustic grand piano, Fender Rhodes electric piano
 Joe Farrell – soprano saxophone, tenor saxophone, flute
 Eddie Gómez – double bass
 Steve Gadd – drums

Chart performance

References

External links 
 Chick Corea - Friends (1978) album review by Scott Yanow, credits & releases at AllMusic
 Chick Corea - Friends (1978) album releases & credits at Discogs
 Chick Corea - Friends (1978) album to be listened as stream on Spotify

1978 albums
Chick Corea albums
Grammy Award for Best Jazz Instrumental Album
Polydor Records albums